Osmond Corbie (28 July 1934 – 8 May 2003) was a Trinidadian cricketer. He played in ten first-class matches for Trinidad and Tobago from 1957 to 1962.

See also
 List of Trinidadian representative cricketers

References

External links
 

1934 births
2003 deaths
Trinidad and Tobago cricketers